Old City Road Stone Arch Bridge is a historic stone arch bridge located near Welch Corners in Herkimer County, New York. It was constructed in 1898 and spans City Brook, a tributary of West Canada Creek.  It is 64 feet long and has a double arch with spans of 28 feet and rise of 12 feet.

It was listed on the National Register of Historic Places in 2001.

References

Road bridges on the National Register of Historic Places in New York (state)
Bridges completed in 1898
Bridges in Herkimer County, New York
National Register of Historic Places in Herkimer County, New York
Stone arch bridges in the United States